Her Danish Majesty's Yacht Dannebrog (A540) was launched by Queen Alexandrine at Copenhagen in 1931, and commissioned on 26 May 1932. The yacht now serves as the official and private residence for Queen Margrethe II of Denmark, and members of the Royal Family when they are on official visits overseas and on summer cruises in Danish waters. When at sea, the Royal Yacht also participates in surveillance and sea-rescue services.

Features
The Dannebrog, named after the flag of Denmark, was built in 1931–1932 at the Naval Dockyard in Copenhagen. She replaced the previous royal vessel, an 1879 paddle steamer, also called Dannebrog. The yacht has dual functions: she serves as the Royal Yacht in peacetime and can become a hospital ship in emergency alerts or war.

The ship's hull is of rivetted steel construction on transverse frames. The ship has a clipper bow and an elliptical ('counter') stern. Viewed from the side, the ship may be divided into two sections. Forward of the funnel there is space for the crew, any cargo, and the engine. At the rear is the Royal Apartment, which could accommodate patients if ever the yacht were needed as a hospital ship. On visits to Danish and foreign ports the covered quarterdeck is used for receptions.

The Royal accommodation comprises studies for the Queen and The Prince Consort, a Dining Saloon, Lounge, Bedrooms, etc. They have taken a personal interest in fitting out the vessel and the choice of furnishings. The Royal Apartment contains furniture and fittings from the previous 1879 Royal vessel.

The Royal Yacht Dannebrog is an independent command, administered by the Chief of the Queen's Naval Household, who is a member of the Royal Household. The crew of the Dannebrog comprises 9 officers, 7 sergeants, 2 enlisted able-seamen and 34 conscripts. The officers are normally seconded for periods of two to four years, whereas the conscripts stay for just one summer.

History
The yacht has also visited European ports, especially in France and cruised the Mediterranean and the Caribbean Seas. Following Operation Safari, in 1943, Dannebrog was the only ship left untouched by the Germans. On 7 July 1956, Dannebrog collided with the British sloop , breaking her bowsprit.

Jørgen Hviid served as one of the ship's captains. A major overhaul was carried out in 1980–81 to extend the life of the yacht into the 21st century. She is still in excellent condition, with major improvements having been made, including replacement of the main engines.

References

External links

The Royal Yacht Dannebrog
Dannebrog
Specifications and photos of Dannebrog - SYT

Auxiliary ships of the Royal Danish Navy
Royal and presidential yachts
1932 ships
Individual yachts
Motor yachts
Naval ships of Denmark